Henry Bayly may refer to:

Henry Paget, 1st Earl of Uxbridge (second creation) (1744–1812), also known as Henry Bayly, British peer
Henry Bayly (British Army officer) (1769–1846)
Henry Bayly (British Army officer, born 1790)
Henry Bayly (MP for Malmesbury), MP for Malmesbury
Henry Bayly (cricketer) (1850–1903), Australian cricketer

See also
Henry Bailey (disambiguation)
Henry Baillie (1803–1885), British politician
Henry Bayley (1777–1844), English clergyman
Henry Baley (died 1701), ship's captain for the Hudson's Bay Company
Henry Bayle (1917–1991), French diplomat